Sir Antony Sher  (14 June 1949 – 2 December 2021) was a British actor, writer and theatre director of South African origin. A two-time Laurence Olivier Award winner and a four-time nominee, he joined the Royal Shakespeare Company in 1982 and toured in many roles, as well as appearing on film and television. In 2001, he starred in his cousin Ronald Harwood's play Mahler's Conversion, and said that the story of a composer sacrificing his faith for his career echoed his own identity struggles.

During his 2017 "Commonwealth Tour", Prince Charles referred to Sher as his favourite actor. Sher and his partner and collaborator Gregory Doran became one of the first same-sex couples to enter into a civil partnership in the UK.

Early life and education 

Sher was born on 14 June 1949  in Cape Town, South Africa, the son of Margery (Abramowitz) and Emmanuel Sher, who worked in business. He was a first cousin once removed of the playwright Sir Ronald Harwood.

He grew up in the suburb of Sea Point, where he attended Sea Point High School.

Sher moved to the United Kingdom in 1968  and auditioned at the Central School of Speech and Drama and the Royal Academy of Dramatic Art (RADA), but was unsuccessful. He instead studied at the Webber Douglas Academy of Dramatic Art from 1969 to 1971 and subsequently on the one-year postgraduate course run jointly by Manchester University Drama Department and the Manchester School of Theatre.

Sher became a British citizen in 1979.

Career

In the 1970s, Sher was part of a group of young actors and writers working at the Liverpool Everyman Theatre. Comprising figures such as writers Alan Bleasdale and Willy Russell and fellow actors Trevor Eve, Bernard Hill, Jonathan Pryce, and Julie Walters, Sher summed up the work of the company with the phrase "anarchy ruled".  He also performed with the theatre group Gay Sweatshop, before joining the Royal Shakespeare Company (RSC) in 1982.

While a member of the RSC, Sher was cast in the title role in Molière's Tartuffe, and played the Fool in King Lear. His major break came in 1984, when he performed the title role in Richard III and won the Laurence Olivier Award. Also for the RSC, Sher performed the lead in such productions as Tamburlaine, Cyrano de Bergerac, Stanley, and Macbeth, and in 2014 played Falstaff in Henry IV Part 1 and Henry IV Part 2 in Stratford-upon-Avon and on national tour. He played the eponymous 'King Lear' from 2016 to 2018. He also played Johnnie in Athol Fugard's Hello and Goodbye, Iago in Othello, Malvolio in Twelfth Night, and Shylock in The Merchant of Venice. Sher received his second Laurence Olivier Award in 1997 for his performance as Stanley Spencer in Stanley.

In 2001, Sher played the role of the composer Gustav Mahler in Ronald Harwood's play Mahler's Conversion, about Mahler's decision to renounce his Jewish faith prior to his appointment as conductor and artistic director of the Vienna State Opera House in 1897. Speaking about the role to The Guardians Rupert Smith, Sher revealed: When I came to England in 1968, at 19, I looked around me and I didn't see any Jewish leading men in the classical theatre, so I thought it best to conceal my Jewishness. Also, I quickly became conscious of apartheid when I arrived here, and I didn't want to be known as a white South African. I was brought up in a very apolitical family. We were happy to enjoy the benefits of apartheid without questioning the system behind it. Reading about apartheid when I came to England was a terrible shock. So I lost the accent almost immediately, and if anyone asked me where I was from I would lie. If they asked where I went to school, I'd say Hampstead, which got me into all sorts of trouble because of course everyone else went to school in Hampstead and they wanted to know which one. Then there was my sexuality. The theatre was full of gay people, but none of them were out, and there was that ugly story about Gielgud being arrested for cottaging, so I thought I'd better hide that as well. Each of these things went into the closet until my entire identity was in the closet. That's why this play appealed to me so much: it's about an artist changing his identity in order to get what he wants.

In 2015 he played Willy Loman in Death of a Salesman.

He also had several film credits to his name, including Yanks (1979), Superman II (1980), Shadey (1985), and Erik the Viking (1989). Sher starred as the Chief Weasel in the 1996 film adaptation of The Wind in the Willows and as Benjamin Disraeli in the 1997 film Mrs Brown.

Sher's television appearances include the mini-series The History Man (1981) and The Jury (2002). In 2003, he played the central character in an adaptation of the J. G. Ballard short story "The Enormous Space", filmed as Home and broadcast on BBC Four. In Hornblower (1999), he played the role of French royalist Colonel de Moncoutant, Marquis de Muzillac, in the episode "The Frogs and the Lobsters". Sher's more recent credits included a cameo in the British comedy film Three and Out (2008) and the role of Akiba in the television play God on Trial (2008).

Sher was cast in the role of Thráin II, father of Thorin Oakenshield in Peter Jackson's The Hobbit: The Desolation of Smaug, but appears only in the Extended Edition of the film.

In 2018, he played the title role in King Lear and was the only person to play both the Fool and King Lear at the Royal Shakespeare Company. He returned to Stratford-upon-Avon in 2019 to perform in Kunene and the King with John Kani.

Other work

Sher's books included the memoirs Year of the King (1985), Woza Shakespeare: Titus Andronicus in South Africa (with Gregory Doran, 1997), Beside Myself (an autobiography, 2002), Primo Time (2005), and Year of the Fat Knight (2015), a book of paintings and drawings, Characters (1990), and the novels Middlepost (1989), Cheap Lives (1995), The Indoor Boy (1996). and The Feast (1999). His 2018 book Year of the Mad King won the 2019 Theatre Book Prize, awarded by the Society for Theatre Research.

Sher also wrote several plays, including I.D. (2003) and Primo (2004). The latter was adapted as a film in 2005. In 2008, The Giant, the first of his plays in which Sher did not feature, was performed at the Hampstead Theatre. The main characters are Michelangelo (at the time of his creation of David), Leonardo da Vinci, and Vito, their mutual apprentice.

In 2005, Sher directed Breakfast With Mugabe at the Swan Theatre, Stratford-upon-Avon. The production moved to the Soho Theatre in April 2006 and the Duchess Theatre one month later. In 2007, he made a crime documentary for Channel 4, titled Murder Most Foul, about his native South Africa. It examines the double murder of actor Brett Goldin and fashion designer Richard Bloom. In 2011, Sher appeared in the BBC TV series The Shadow Line in the role of Glickman.

Personal life
In 2005, Sher and the director Gregory Doran, with whom he frequently collaborated professionally, became one of the first gay couples to enter into a civil partnership in the UK. They married on 30 December 2015, a little over ten years after their civil partnership.

On 10 September 2021 it was announced that Sher was terminally ill, and Doran took compassionate leave from the RSC to care for him. Sher died from cancer at his home in Stratford-upon-Avon on 2 December 2021, aged 72.

Stage performances

Theatre
 1972–74: Multiple roles at the Everyman Theatre, Liverpool.
 1974: Ringo Starr in Willy Russell's John, Paul, George, Ringo ... and Bert at the Everyman Theatre, where it opened in May 1974. Transferred to the Lyric Theatre in August.
 1975: Teeth 'n' Smiles by David Hare at the Royal Court Theatre where it opened in September 1975, subsequently transferring to Wyndham's Theatre in May 1976.
 1979: American Days by Stephen Poliakoff at the ICA , London.
 1982: Mike Leigh's Goosepimples in the West End.
 1982: The Fool in King Lear at the Royal Shakespeare Theatre. Transferred to the Barbican Centre in 1983.
 1984: Richard III with the Royal Shakespeare Company. Transferred to the Barbican Centre in 1985.
 1985: Torch Song Trilogy at the Albery Theatre, West End.
 1985: Red Noses at the Barbican Theatre, London.
 1987: Shylock in The Merchant of Venice with the RSC.
 1987: Henry Irving in Happy Birthday, Sir Larry at the Royal National Theatre, London (Laurence Olivier 80th birthday tribute).
 1988: Vendice in The Revenger's Tragedy with the RSC.
 1990: Peter Flannery's Singer with the RSC, Barbican Theatre.
 1991: Kafka's The Trial and Brecht's The Resistible Rise of Arturo Ui at the National Theatre.
 1993: Henry Carr in Travesties at the Barbican Centre with the RSC, later at the Savoy Theatre, West End. Tambourlaine with the RSC, Swan Theatre, Stratford.
 1994–95: Titus Andronicus at the Market Theatre, Johannesburg. Transferred to the National Theatre and for a UK tour.
 1997: Stanley at the National Theatre (repeated on Broadway at the Circle in the Square Theatre)
 1997: Cyrano de Bergerac at the Lyric Theatre, West End.
 1998–99: The Winter's Tale at the Barbican Centre with the RSC
 1999: Macbeth at the Swan Theatre, Stratford-upon-Avon, with the RSC
 2000–01: Macbeth and The Winter's Tale with the RSC
 2002: RSC's Jacobean season transfers to the West End.
 2003: I.D. at the Almeida Theatre, London
 2004: Primo at the Cottesloe Theatre, Royal National Theatre, London (repeated on Broadway at the Music Box Theatre, July–August 2005)
 2007: Kean in Kean at the Yvonne Arnaud Theatre, Guildford. Transferred to the Apollo Theatre, West End in May.
 2008: Prospero in The Tempest at the Baxter Theatre, Cape Town; Courtyard Theatre, Stratford-upon-Avon; and on tour in Richmond, Leeds, Bath, Nottingham and Sheffield
 2010: Tomas Stockmann in An Enemy of the People at the Sheffield Crucible
 2011: Phillip Gellburg in Arthur Miller's Broken Glass at the Vaudeville Theatre
 2012: Jacob Bindel in Travelling Light at the Royal National Theatre, Sigmund Freud in Hysteria by Terry Johnson at Theatre Royal Bath, later revived at Hampstead Theatre in 2013.
 2013: Wilhelm Voigt in The Captain of Köpenick at the Olivier Theatre, Royal National Theatre, London.
 2014: Falstaff in Henry IV, Part 1 and Henry IV Part 2 with the Royal Shakespeare Company.
 2015: Willy Loman in Death of a Salesman by Arthur Miller with the Royal Shakespeare Company.
 2016: The title role in King Lear with the Royal Shakespeare Company (reprised in 2018).
 2018: Nicolas in One for the Road from Pinter One at the Harold Pinter Theatre with The Jamie Lloyd Company.
 2019-20: Jack Morris in Kunene and the King with the Royal Shakespeare Company.

Filmography

Film

Television

Awards and nominations

BAFTA TV Awards

0 win, 1 nomination

Laurence Olivier Awards

2 wins, 4 nominations

Drama Desk Awards

1 win and 1 nomination

Evening Standard Theatre Awards

1 win and 1 nomination

Evening Standard British Film Awards

1 win and 1 nomination

Screen Actors Guild Awards

1 win and 1 nomination

Theatre Awards UK (TMA)

1 win and 1 nomination

Tony Awards

0 win and 1 nomination

Honours
 1998: Honorary Doctor of Letters (Hon. Litt.D.) from the University of Liverpool
 2000: Knight Commander of the Most Excellent Order of the British Empire (KBE) for services to theatre
 2007: Honorary Doctor of Letters (Hon. Litt.D.) from the University of Warwick
 2010: Honorary Doctor of Letters (Hon. Litt.D.) from the University of Cape Town

References

External links

Antony Sher at the British Film Institute
Antony Sher (Aveleyman)
Article in The Spectator

1949 births
2021 deaths
20th-century English male actors
20th-century English novelists
21st-century English male actors
21st-century English writers
Actors awarded knighthoods
Alumni of Sea Point High School
Alumni of the Webber Douglas Academy of Dramatic Art
British LGBT novelists
British documentary filmmakers
British gay writers
British male dramatists and playwrights
British male television writers
Deaths from cancer in England
Drama Desk Award winners
English Jews
English dramatists and playwrights
English gay actors
English male film actors
English male novelists
English male stage actors
English male television actors
English male voice actors
English memoirists
English people of Lithuanian-Jewish descent
English television writers
English theatre directors
Jewish British male actors
LGBT Jews
British LGBT dramatists and playwrights
Gay memoirists
British LGBT screenwriters
South African LGBT dramatists and playwrights
Laurence Olivier Award winners
Male actors from Cape Town
Naturalised citizens of the United Kingdom
Outstanding Performance by a Cast in a Motion Picture Screen Actors Guild Award winners
Royal Shakespeare Company members
South African Army personnel
South African Knights Commander of the Order of the British Empire
South African emigrants to the United Kingdom
South African knights
Theatre World Award winners
Writers from Cape Town